LPD or lpd can refer to

La Part-Dieu in Lyon
Landing Platform Dock, a type of naval warship
Laser Phosphor Display, a large-format display technology
Lean Product Development
The Legendary Pink Dots, a European band
Lighting power density
Lincoln Police Department, Nebraska; see List of law enforcement agencies in Nebraska
Line Printer Daemon protocol, in Unix-like operating systems
Living Planet Database
Louisville Police Department, now the Louisville Metro Police Department
Lowell Police Department, Massachusetts, US
LPD433, license-free radio communications band
Luteal phase defect
Lymphoproliferative disorders, in which lymphocytes are produced in excessive quantities
Luteal phase defect, Lignje Pa Doma